Tieber is a surname. Notable people with the surname include:

Elisabeth Tieber (born 1990), Austrian footballer
László Tieber (born 1949), Hungarian footballer
Michael Tieber (born 1988), Austrian footballer

See also
Teber
Wieber